The 2012 Leeds City Council election took place on Thursday 3 May 2012 to elect members to Leeds City Council in England. It was held on the same day as other local elections across the UK.

As per the election cycle, one third of the council's seats were up for election. The councillors subsequently elected replaced those elected when their individual seats were previously contested in 2008.

Since taking majority control of the council in 2011, the Labour council administration increased their total number of councillors from 55 to 63. They won eight more seats at the election, including six from the Liberal Democrats.

Election result

This result had the following consequences for the total number of seats on the council after the elections:

Councillors who did not stand for re-election

Ward results

By-elections between 2012 and 2014

Notes

References

2012 English local elections
2012
2010s in Leeds